Harpo's Ghost is the seventh album by English singer-songwriter Thea Gilmore. It was released in August 2006 on Sanctuary Records. The album peaked at number 69 on the UK Albums Chart.

Track listing

All songs written by Thea Gilmore, except where noted.

"The Gambler" – 4:28
"Everybody's Numb" – 3:46
"Red White and Black" – 4:12
"Call Me Your Darling" – 3:41
"We Built a Monster" (Thea Gilmore, Mike Scott) – 3:21
"The List" – 4:06
"Going Down" – 3:10
"Whistle and Steam" (Thea Gilmore, Mike Scott, Nigel Stonier) – 4:07
"Cheap Tricks" – 3:39
"Contessa" – 4:57
"Slow Journey II"/"Play Until the Bottle's Gone" (Stonier) – 9:38

Personnel
 Thea Gilmore – vocals, whistling, acoustic guitar, backing vocals
 Nigel Stonier – acoustic guitar, electric guitar, dulcimer, ukulele, harmonica, harmonium, organ, Wurlitzer organ, backing vocals
 Dave Hull-Denholm – acoustic guitar, backing vocals
 Eric Ambel – electric guitar, harmonium
 Steve Evans – electric guitar, Wurlitzer organ
 Ewan Davies – E-bow, programming
 Laura Reid – cello
 Paul Beavis – drums
 John Tonks – percussion
 Kathryn Williams – backing vocals

References

External links
Official site

2006 albums
Thea Gilmore albums